Archive Series No. 2: Live In Chicago Q101 is a live broadcast 'studio' album performed in Chicago on April 22, 2000 and released by Violent Femmes in 2006. Includes banter between selections.

Track listing

Personnel 
 Gordon Gano – vocals, acoustic guitar
 Brian Ritchie – acoustic bass guitar, backing vocals
 Guy Hoffman – snare drum, percussion, backing vocals

Additional musicians
 Hani Naser – Arabic percussion (tracks 6,7,8)
 Sigmund Snopek III – piano, flute (tracks 6,7,8)

References

Violent Femmes live albums
2006 live albums